Grzegorz Knapski (Knapiusz, Cnapius; 1561–1639) was a Polish Jesuit, teacher, philologist, lexicographer and writer.

Works
His most important work is the Thesaurus Polono-Latino-Graecus. First published in 1621 in Kraków, second edition in 1643 also in Kraków, it became a standard reference work in Polish schools and universities until the 18th century.

See also
List of Poles

External links
Thesaurus Polonolatinograecus seu Promptuarium linguae Latinae et Graecae

1561 births
1639 deaths
17th-century Latin-language writers
17th-century Polish dramatists and playwrights
Polish male dramatists and playwrights
17th-century Polish Jesuits
Polish lexicographers
Polish philologists
17th-century male writers
16th-century Polish Jesuits